The Muslim Women (Protection of Rights on Marriage) Act, 2019 is an Act of the Parliament of India criminalising triple talaq. In August 2017, the Supreme Court of India declared triple talaq, which enables Muslim men to instantly divorce their wives, to be unconstitutional. The minority opinion suggested the Parliament to consider appropriate legislation governing triple talaq in the Muslim community.

In December 2017, citing the Supreme Court judgment and cases of triple talaq in India, the government introduced The Muslim Women (Protection of Rights on Marriage) Bill, 2017. The bill proposed to make triple talaq in any form—spoken, in writing, or by electronic means—illegal and void. Punishment for breach of the law was proposed to include up to three years imprisonment for the husband pronouncing triple talaq. The bill was passed by the Lok Sabha, the lower house of the Parliament of India, on the same day, but was stalled by the opposition in the Rajya Sabha, the upper house.

The bill was reintroduced and passed by the Lok Sabha and by the Rajya Sabha in July 2019. Consequently, the bill received assent of the President of India. The act also entitles an aggrieved woman  to demand a maintenance for her dependent children. It was subsequently notified as law in the same month. The acts stands to be retrospectively effective from 19 September 2018. However, even after five years since Supreme Court’s invalidation of triple talaq, the women petitioners who were abandoned by their husbands, continue to live a life of half-divorcees.

However, Muslim men are still allowed to be polygamous and can also give a divorce easily by paying paltry sums.

History
The 2017 bill was passed by the Lok Sabha on 27 December 2018. However, in the Rajya Sabha the opposition demanded it to be sent to the Standing Committee. As the bill stood not passed in the parliamentary session, an ordinance which had made the bill operative, expired on 22 January 2019. The government re-promulgated an identical bill on 10 January 2019. This bill was passed in the Lok Sabha but was again stalled in the Rajya Sabha. The bill lapsed again when the Parliamentary session adjourned sine die in April 2019.

The Muslim Women (Protection of Rights on Marriage) Ordinance, 2019 was to expire on 29 August 2019, six weeks after start of parliamentary session, post the 2019 Indian general elections. The government introduced a new bill in the Lok Sabha on 21 June 2019. It was passed by the Lok Sabha on 25 July 2019 and by the Rajya Sabha on 30 July 2019. The bill was assented to by the President, Ram Nath Kovind, on 31 July 2019. It was subsequently notified in the gazette on the same day. The act is retrospectively effective from 19 September 2018.

The Muslim Women (Protection of Rights on Marriage) Bill, 2017
The government had formulated the bill claiming 100 cases of instant triple talaq, since the Supreme Court judgement in August 2017 prohibiting triple talaq in India. On 28 December 2017, the Lok Sabha had passed the Muslim Women (Protection of Rights on Marriage) Bill, 2017. The bill proposed to make triple talaq in any form — spoken, in writing or by electronic means such as email, SMS and instant messengers illegal and void, with up to three years imprisonment for the husband who pronounces triple talaq. The Communist Party of India (Marxist), Rashtriya Janata Dal, All India Majlis-e-Ittehadul Muslimeen, Biju Janata Dal, All India Anna Dravida Munnetra Kazhagam and Indian Union Muslim League opposed the bill, calling it arbitrary and faulty, while the Indian National Congress supported the bill.

The Muslim Women (Protection of Rights on Marriage) Bill, 2018
Later, the Muslim Women (Protection of Rights on Marriage) Bill (2018) was  proposed which intended to protect Muslim women. The bill was passed in 2018 and 2019 by the Lok Sabha, but lapsed after not being passed by the Rajya Sabha.

On 19 September 2018, noting that the practice of instant triple talaq had continued unabated despite the 2017 judicial mandate, the government issued The Muslim Women (Protection of Rights on Marriage) Ordinance, 2018. An ordinance introduced into the Indian parliament lapses if either the Parliament does not approve it within six weeks of reassembly, or if disapproving resolutions are passed by both houses. Hence, a new bill named The Muslim Women (Protection of Rights on Marriage) Bill, 2018 was introduced in the Lok Sabha by Union Law Minister, Ravi Shankar Prasad.

The Muslim Women (Protection of Rights on Marriage) Ordinance, 2019 
As the triple talaq ordinance of 2018 was to expire on 22 January 2019 and also because The Muslim Women (Protection of Rights on Marriage) Bill, 2018 could not be passed, the government repromulgated the ordinance on 10 January 2019. On 12 January 2019, the president approved the 2019 ordinance.

The Muslim Women (Protection of Rights on Marriage) Act, 2019 
The Muslim Women (Protection of Rights on Marriage) Ordinance, 2019 was repealed on 31 July 2019 when the bill was passed by both houses of the legislature, Lok Sabha and Rajya Sabha, and was notified by the President of India in the official gazette, and thus became an Act of Parliament. The Act has 8 sections.

Provisions 
The act statutorily provides:

See also 
 The Muslim Women (Protection of Rights on Divorce) Act 1986
 Triple talaq in India
 Muslim Women Rights Day

References

Islam in India
Women's rights in India
Women's rights legislation
Muslim politics in India
Law about religion in India
Marriage law in India
Acts of the Parliament of India 2019
Modi administration
2019 in Indian law